Richmond Antwi (born 7 August 2000) is a Ghanaian footballer who last played as a forward for USL Championship side Phoenix Rising FC.

Club career

Early career
Richmond began his football career with a youth club Tema Sports Youth in Tema. Richmond later moved to Al Khartoum FC in Sudan. He stayed at Al Khartoum FC for a season, played a lot of games and won the league goal king for the 2018–2019 season. Richmond got huge attention nationwide because of his outstanding performance.
Richmond helped Al Khartoum FC to finish 3rd on the league table and later joined Al-Merrikh SC.

Al-Merrikh
In January 2020, Richmond was transferred to Sudan Premier League club Al-Merrikh SC on a deal to end the season. He tallied 7 goals in 14 league matches, emerging as one of the top front men in the league as Al-Merrikh clinched a league title.

Legon Cities
In February 2021, Richmond signed for Legon Cities FC.

Phoenix Rising
Antwi joined Phoenix Rising FC of the USL Championship in December 2021. Antwi led Phoenix Rising in goals per minutes played, however his contract option for 2023 was declined at the conclusion of the 2022 season.

Career statistics

Club

Honours

Al-Merrikh
 Sudan Premier League winner: 2019-2020

Individual
 Sudan Premier League Top Goalscorer: 2018-2019 season

References

Living people
2000 births
Ghanaian footballers
Association football forwards
Al Khartoum SC players
Al-Merrikh SC players
Sudan Premier League players
Ghana Premier League players
Ghanaian expatriate footballers
Ghanaian expatriate sportspeople in Sudan
Expatriate footballers in Sudan
Footballers from Kumasi
Ghanaian expatriate sportspeople in the United States
Expatriate soccer players in the United States
Phoenix Rising FC players
USL Championship players